Cangrelor, sold under the brand name Kengreal in the United States, CANREAL in India ( MSN Labs ) and Kengrexal in the European Union) is a P2Y12 inhibitor FDA approved as of June 2015 as an antiplatelet drug for intravenous application. Some P2Y12 inhibitors are used clinically as effective inhibitors of adenosine diphosphate-mediated platelet activation and aggregation. Unlike clopidogrel (Plavix), which is a prodrug, cangrelor is an active drug not requiring metabolic conversion.

Poor interim results led to the abandonment of the two CHAMPION clinical trials in mid-2009.  The BRIDGE study, for short term use prior to surgery, continues. The CHAMPION PHOENIX trial was a randomized study of over 11,000 patients published in 2013.  It found usefulness of cangrelor in patients getting cardiac stents.  Compared with clopidogrel given around the time of stenting, intravenous ADP-receptor blockade with cangrelor significantly reduced the rate of stent thrombosis and myocardial infarction. Reviewers have questioned the methodology of the trial.

Medical use
According to recent phase 3 randomized trials, a cangrelor–clopidogrel combination is safe and has been found to be more effective than standard clopidogrel treatment at reducing ischemic events in the heart, without increasing major bleeding in the treatment of stenotic coronary arteries. The advantages of this drug combination are most prominent in patients with myocardial infarction.

Available antiplatelet drugs have delayed onset and offset of action. Since cangrelor's effects are immediate and quickly reversed, it is a more desirable drug for elective treatment of stenotic coronary arteries, high risk acute coronary syndromes treated with immediate coronary stenting, and for bridging those surgery patients who require P2Y12 inhibition.

Current evidence regarding cangrelor therapy is limited by the lack studies assessing cangrelor administration in conjunction with either prasugrel or ticagrelor.

Recently, it's been approved for adult patients undergoing percutaneous coronary intervention (PCI).

Pharmacology
Cangrelor is a high-affinity, reversible inhibitor of P2Y12 receptors that causes almost complete inhibition of ADP-induced platelet aggregate. It is a modified ATP derivative stable to enzymatic degradation. It does not require metabolic conversion to an active metabolite. This allows cangrelor's immediate effect after infusion, and the therapeutic effects can be maintained with continuous infusion. The pharmacokinetics of cangrelor has allowed it to rapidly achieve steady-state concentrations with a clearance of 50 L/h and a half-life of 2.6 to 3.3 minutes. Cessation of its administration is associated with rapid removal, and normal platelet function is restored within 1 hour.

Adverse effects
Despite fewer bleeding events during cardiac surgery, cangrelor carries the risk of potential autoimmune reactions manifesting as breathlessness. Potential mechanisms for dyspnea following cangrelor treatment include: repeated binding and unbinding cycles, impaired platelet turnover, and lung sequestration or apoptosis of overloaded destructive platelets. The dyspnea risks following cangrelor treatment, suggest a common mechanism linking transfusion-related acute lung injury, dyspnea, and reversible platelet inhibition.

The risk of breathlessness after intravenous cangrelor is smaller when compared with other reversible platelet P2Y12 receptor inhibitors, however, it is still significantly higher when compared to irreversible oral antiplatelet drugs or intravenous glycoprotein IIb/IIIa inhibitors; which do not increase the incidence of breathlessness at all.

References

External links 
 
 

Adenosine diphosphate receptor inhibitors
Nucleotides
Organochlorides
Trifluoromethyl compounds
Thioethers